Llao Rock is a rock pillar in Klamath County, Oregon, in the United States. It is located on the north rim of Crater Lake in Crater Lake National Park. Topographic relief is significant as the summit rises 1,870 feet above the lake in 0.28 mile.

The rock pillar was named after Llao, a Native American god. The landform's toponym was officially adopted in 1897 by the United States Board on Geographic Names.

Climate

Based on the Köppen climate classification, Llao Rock has a subalpine climate. Most weather fronts originate in the Pacific Ocean, and travel east toward the Cascades where they are forced upward by the range (Orographic lift), causing them to drop their moisture in the form of rain or snowfall. As a result, the Cascades experience high precipitation, especially during the winter months in the form of snowfall. Winter temperatures can drop below  with wind chill factors below . In the Crater Lake area, winter lasts eight months with an average snowfall of 41 feet (12.5 m) per year. During winter months, weather is usually cloudy, but due to high pressure systems over the Pacific Ocean that intensify during summer months, there is often little or no cloud cover during the summer.

Gallery

See also
 
 Geology of the Pacific Northwest

References

External links
 Crater Lake National Park (National Park Service)

Landforms of Klamath County, Oregon
Rock formations of Oregon
Mountains of Oregon
North American 2000 m summits
Cascade Range